Le Grand Duc is a Lucky Luke adventure written by Goscinny and illustrated by Morris. It is the fortieth book in the series and it was originally published in French in the year 1973 and by Cinebook in 2011 under the title of The Grand Duke. The story is loosely based on the Grand Duke Alexei Alexandrovich of Russia, who undertook a tour of America in 1870–1871.

Plot
The Russian Grand Duke Leonid pays a diplomatic visit to the United States. However, a great reader of James Fenimore Cooper, in order for an important treaty to be completed, he first wants to have a recreational trip through the West, complete with bandits and Indian attacks! Lucky Luke is assigned as a bodyguard to the duke, who is quickly targeted by all sorts of villainous persons — first and foremost a Russian anarchist who tries his best (or his worst) to assassinate the Grand Duke. With the interpreter of the Grand Duke, they travel the country, chased by the mysterious terrorist trying to assassinate the diplomat. Their journey begins in Abilene, the city where cowboys meet.

Characters 
 Grand Duke Leonid of Russia: A huge aristocrat, on a diplomatic visit to the U.S. Does not speak English.
 Colonel Fedor Mikhaïlovitch Boulenkov: The Grand Duke's minute aide-de-camp and interpreter. Speaks slightly imperfect English (referring to a horse as a "horseradish").
 Russian anarchist: An unnamed anarchist who repeatedly tries to kill the Duke, without success. His attempts are never even noticed by the people targeted.
 Laura Legs: A saloon dancer who will reappear later in other stories: Settlement of accounts (published in The Hanged Man's Rope) and The Man Who Shot Lucky Luke.

Analysis 

This fictional character is most likely inspired by the real Grand Duke Alexis Alexandrovich of Russia, son of Emperor Alexander II and ambassador to the United States, whose trip to America from 1871 to 1872 left a picturesque memory, especially when he distinguished himself during a buffalo hunt with the famous Buffalo Bill.

External links
 Lucky Luke official site album index 
 Goscinny website on Lucky Luke

Comics by Morris (cartoonist)
Lucky Luke albums
1973 graphic novels
Works by René Goscinny
Fictional dukes and duchesses